Tolva, in Catalan: Tolba is a town and municipality in the province of Huesca, in Aragon, Spain. It is located 696 metres above sea level in the north-eastern part of Huesca, in the comarca of Ribagorza.

The municipality is composed of several villages: Luzás (Lluçars), Sagarras Bajas (Sagarres Baixes) and La Almunia de San Lorenzo (L'Almúnia de Sant Llorenç).

Municipalities in the Province of Huesca